Ditte Kotzian (born 9 March 1979, in East Berlin) is a German diver. She and Heike Fischer won bronze for Diving at the 2008 Summer Olympics – Women's synchronized 3 metre springboard. She had competed in the two previous Olympics without placing. She and Fischer had previously won a silver medal for Diving at the 2007 World Aquatics Championships.

References

External links
 Private Homepage of Ditte Kotzian

1979 births
Living people
Divers from Berlin
German female divers
Olympic divers of Germany
Olympic bronze medalists for Germany
Divers at the 2000 Summer Olympics
Divers at the 2004 Summer Olympics
Divers at the 2008 Summer Olympics
Olympic medalists in diving
Medalists at the 2008 Summer Olympics
Universiade medalists in diving
Universiade silver medalists for Germany
Medalists at the 2001 Summer Universiade
Medalists at the 2003 Summer Universiade
World Aquatics Championships medalists in diving
20th-century German women
21st-century German women